Tovey can refer to:

People
 Arthur Gordon Tovey (1901–1974), New Zealand artist
 Bramwell Tovey (b. 1953), British conductor and composer
 Brian Tovey (1926–2015), British intelligence analyst
 Cameron Tovey (b. 1985), Australian former basketball player
 Donald Francis Tovey (1875–1940), British musical analyst, musicologist
 Doreen Tovey (1918–2008), English writer
 Eric Tovey, British midget wrestler professionally known as Lord Littlebrook
 Frank Tovey (1956-2002), British musician, who also recorded under the name Fad Gadget
 Geoffrey Tovey (1916–2001), physician specializing in hematology
 Jason Tovey (b. 1989), Welsh rugby union player
 Jessica Tovey (b. 1987), Australian actress
 John Tovey, 1st Baron Tovey (1885–1971), British admiral in World War II, also known as Jack Tovey
 John Ronald Tovey, British cyclist
 John Tovey (restaurateur), British restaurateur and chef
 Mark Tovey (b. 1955), retired South African footballer
 Neil Tovey (b. 1962), South African football player
 Noel Tovey (b. 1934), Australian dancer and actor
 Richard Tovey (1930–2002), Australian cricketer 
 Roberta Tovey (b. 1953), English actress
 Russell Tovey (b. 1981), English actor
 Wilson Tovey (1874–1950), English cricketer

Places
 Tovey Battery, Gibraltar
 Tovey, Illinois, United States

See also

Toney, surname